Ater Fort is a fort located  west of Bhind in Bhind district, Madhya Pradesh, India. It was built by Bhadauria kings Badan Singh, Maha Singh and Bakhat Singh between 1664 and 1668.

Architecture
Khooni Darwaza, Badan Singh Ka Mahal, Hathiapor, Raja Ka Bangla, Rani Ka Bangla and Barah Khamba Mahal are some of the structures present in the fort.

References

Forts in Madhya Pradesh